Boggs Township is the name of some places in the U.S. state of Pennsylvania:
Boggs Township, Armstrong County, Pennsylvania
Boggs Township, Centre County, Pennsylvania
Boggs Township, Clearfield County, Pennsylvania

Pennsylvania township disambiguation pages